Robert Denig may refer to:
 Robert L. Denig (1884–1979), United States Marine Corps general
 Robert S. Denig (1946–1995), bishop of the Episcopal Diocese of Western Massachusetts